Tavernelle is a frazione of Panicale, in the province of Perugia. With more than 2.800 inhabitants, it's the most populated placed in the comune and main economic centre.

Main sights 
 Castello di Mongiovino
 Palazzo dell'Orologio
 Chiesa di San Rocco
 Chiesa di San Luigi Gonzaga
 , built from 1524 to 1728. 
 Santuario della Madonna delle Grondici, XV century
 Fontana del Leone

References

Panicale
Frazioni of the Province of Perugia